5 Album Studio Set is a box set collection by the Clash released in September 2013. The box contains newly re-mastered by Mick Jones of the band's first five albums on eight discs minus their final album, Cut the Crap. The albums came in vinyl replica packaging and the box was designed exclusively by the band.

The set was released simultaneously with an expanded eleven disc box set titled Sound System and a greatest hits package titled The Clash Hits Back. They are expected to be the final releases to involve Mick Jones, who said: "I'm not even thinking about any more Clash releases. This is it for me, and I say that with an exclamation mark."

Remastering
Jones said "The concept of the whole thing is best box set ever. Re-mastering's a really amazing thing. That was the musical point of it all, because there's so much there that you wouldn't have heard before. It was like discovering stuff, because the advances in mastering are so immense since the last time [the Clash catalogue] was remastered in the 90s."

All the music has been remastered from the original tapes, Jones said. "We had to bake the tapes beforehand – the oxide on them is where the music is, so if you don't put them in the oven and bake them, that all falls off, because they're so old."

The Clash's bassist Paul Simonon highlighted a guitar line on "Safe European Home", from the band's second album Give 'Em Enough Rope, saying he'd never even heard it before. "It's probably some session musician, while I was asleep," Jones joked.

Track listing

References

2013 compilation albums
The Clash compilation albums
Legacy Recordings compilation albums
Albums produced by Sandy Pearlman
Albums produced by Bill Price (record producer)
Albums produced by Guy Stevens